Gynautocera rubriscutellata is a species of moth of the family Zygaenidae found in Taiwan. It was  first described by Hering in 1922.

Description  
Gynautocera rubriscutellata is a diurnal species, active in low elevation areas, with a wingspan of 85–90 mm. Its hindwings are shorter than that of Histia flabellicornis, another species of Zygaenidae with a similar appearance. Part of its hindwings bear metallic blue coloration. It is also very similar in appearance to G. papilionaria, which is also found in southeast Asia.

References

External links 
GBIF species

Chalcosiinae
Endemic fauna of Taiwan
Moths described in 1922